Purpura panama, common names Rudolph's purpura, salmon-lipped whelk, is a species of sea snail, a marine gastropod mollusk, in the family Muricidae, the murex snails or rock snails.

Distribution
This species occurs in the following locations:
 East Coast of South Africa
 Mozambique

References

panama
Gastropods described in 1798